Multan Saddar is a tehsil located in Multan District, Punjab, Pakistan. The population is 1,322,756 according to the 2017 census.

See also 
 List of tehsils of Punjab, Pakistan

References 

Tehsils of Punjab, Pakistan
Populated places in Multan District